György Sztantics (Szabadka, 19 August 1878 – Szabadka, 10 July 1918) was a Hungarian athlete (ethnic Bunjevac from today's Serbia) who competed mainly in the 3000 metre walk.

He competed for Hungary at the 1906 Intercalated Games held in Athens, Greece in the 3000 metre walk where he won the gold medal.

References

1878 births
1918 deaths
Hungarian male racewalkers
Medalists at the 1906 Intercalated Games
Athletes (track and field) at the 1906 Intercalated Games
Bunjevci
Sportspeople from Subotica